Claudia Noack (born 27 September 1961) is a German rower who competed for East Germany.

Noack grew up in East Berlin. As a 12-year-old, she got a mention in the Berliner Zeitung for having kept an alleyway with steps in Altglienicke free of debris and weeds for years.

Noack rowed for SC Berlin-Grünau. At the 1978 World Rowing Junior Championships in Belgrade, she competed with the junior women's eight and won gold.

At the 1983 World Rowing Championships, she won a gold medal in the women's coxed four event.

References

East German female rowers
World Rowing Championships medalists for East Germany
Living people
1961 births